"Autoschizis" is a term derived from the Greek αὐτο- auto-, meaning "self", and σχίζειν skhizein, "to split". It was introduced in 1998 to describe a novel form of cancer cell death characterized by a reduction in cell size that occurs due to the loss of cytoplasm through  self-excision (the cell splits open) without the loss of cell organelles, morphologic degradation of the cells nucleus and nucleolus without the formation of apoptotic bodies and destruction of the cell membrane. The cell death results from karyorrhexis and karyolysis. Autoschizis can be initiated via in vivo treatment with vitamin C (VC), synthetic vitamin K (VK3) or, better, a combination of both. The treatment has been tested on various types of cancer cells in vitro and in vivo with positive results.

Notes

References
H.S. Taper, J.M. Jamison, J. Gilloteaux, C. A. Gwin, T. Gordon, J.L Summers: 2001 In vivo reactivation of DNases in implanted human prostate tumors after administration of vitamin C/K3 combination. Journal of Histochemistry and Cytochemistry 49: 109-119.
J. Gilloteaux, J.M. Jamison, D. Arnold, J.L. Summers:  Autoschizis: another cell death for cancer cells induced by oxidative stress. Ital. J. Anat. Embryol.- Advances in Microanatomy of Cells and Tissues, Malpighi Collection: 2001; 106 suppl. 1): 79 - 92.	 
J. Gilloteaux, J.M. Jamison, D. Arnold, H.S. Taper, J.L. Summers. 2001: Ultrastructural aspects of autoschizis: A new cancer cell death induced by the synergistic action of ascorbate / menadione on human bladder carcinoma cells. Ultrastructural Pathology: 25: 183-192.
J. Gilloteaux, J.M.Jamison, D. Arnold, H.S. Taper, J. L.Summers: 2003. Microscopic aspects of autoschizic cell death in human ovarian carcinoma (2774) cells following vitamin C, vitamin K3 or vitamin C;K3 treatment. Microscopy and Microanalysis. 9(4): 311 -329.
J. Gilloteaux, J.M. Jamison, D. Arnold, J.L. Summers: 2003. LM and SEM aspects of autoschizic cell death of ovarian carcinoma cells. Scanning 25: 137-149.
J.M. Jamison, J. Gilloteaux, M.R. Nassiri, M. Venugopal, D. Neal, J.L. Summers: 2004 Cycle cycle arrest and autoschizis in a human bladder carcinoma cell line following vitamin C and vitamin K3 treatment. Biochemical Pharmacology, 67: 337-351.
 J. Gilloteaux, J.M. Jamison, D. Jarjoura, H.E. Lorimer, D.R. Neal, H.S. Taper, J.L.Summers. 2004 Autoschizis: a new form of cell death for human ovarian carcinoma cells following ascorbate: menadione treatment. Nuclear and DNA degradation. Tissue and Cell, 36: 197-209. 
H.S. Taper, J.M. Jamison, J. Gilloteaux, J.L. Summers, P.B. Calderon. 2004. Inhibition of the development of metastases by dietary vitamin C: K3 combination. Life Sciences 75: 955-967; doi: 10.1016/j.lfs.2004.02.011
J. Gilloteaux, JM Jamison, DA Neal, JL Summers. 2005. Cell death by autoschizis in TRAMP prostate carcinoma cells as a result of treatment by ascorbate: 	 menadione combination. Ultrastructural Pathology, 28 (3): 221-236. 
J. Gilloteaux, J.M. Jamison, D. Arnold, D.R. Neal, and J.L. Summers. 2006. Morphology and DNA degeneration during autoschizic cell death in bladder carcinoma T24 cells induced by ascorbate and menadione treatment. Anatomical Record A Discovery Molecular, Cell and Evolutionary Biology. 288 : 58-83.
JM Jamison, J Gilloteaux, L Perlaky, M Thiry, K Smetana, D Neal, K McGuire, JL Summers:. 2010. Nucleolar changes and fibrillarin, redistribution following Apatone © treatment of human bladder carcinoma cells. J Histochemistry and Cytochemistry. 58 (7): 635-651.
J. Gilloteaux, JM Jamison, DR. Neal B.S., M.Loukas, Th. Doberzstyn, JL.Summers. 2010 Cell damage and death by autoschizis in human bladder (RT4) carcinoma cells resulting  from treatment by ascorbate and menadione. Ultrastructural Pathology. 34(3): 140-160.
J Gilloteaux, J M Jamison, D. Arnold, JL Summers.  Autoschizis: A Mode of Cell Death of Cancer Cells Induced by a Prooxidant Treatment In Vitro and In Vivo. 2018  Chapter 28; 583-704.  In: ‘Apoptosis and Beyond’ 2 vol. James A Radosevich (Editor); J Wiley – Blackwell; 

Programmed cell death